Transform Drug Policy Foundation (Transform) is a registered non-profit charity based in the United Kingdom working in drug policy reform. As an independent think tank, Transform works to promote public health, social justice and human rights through drug policy reform, seeking to achieve these goals through the legal regulation of the production, supply and use of drugs.

Transform began as an independent campaign group called Transform Drugs Campaign Ltd, and was set up in 1996 by its former Head of External Affairs, Danny Kushlick. The organisation achieved charitable status in 2003 and was renamed 'Transform Drug Policy Foundation' in 2004. In 2007, Transform became the first UK based non-governmental organisation calling for drug law reform to be granted special consultative status at the United Nations.

In 2012, Transform launched a Latin American programme of work in collaboration with the Mexico City-based NGO México Unido Contra la Delincuencia (MUCD).

In 2015, Transform launched 'Anyone's Child: Families For Safer Drug Control', a campaign to end the war on drugs, better protect children, and get drugs under control. Anyone's Child is an international network of families who have been adversely affected by existing drug laws and campaign for their reform.

Policy work
Transform's vision:To create a world where drug policy promotes health, protects the vulnerable, and puts safety first.Transform's mission:To educate the public and policymakers on effective drug policy; to develop and promote viable alternatives to prohibition; to provide a voice for those directly affected by drug policy failures; and to support policymakers and practitioners in achieving positive change.Transform develops and advocates for new policies to bring currently illegal drugs under effective legal control and regulation based on evidence of effectiveness. It argues that current policy is outdated and counter-productive, having been based on law and order politics and misplaced 'drug war' ideologies. Instead, the organisation proposes that moves towards legal regulation and control of currently illegal drugs would produce dramatically improved policy outcomes as measured by key performance indicators in crime, public health and well being, environmental damage, international corruption and conflict, and public expenditure.

Transform works with policy-makers, charities and funders across the health, crime and social policy sectors. It works at both a local and national level in the United Kingdom, and also works internationally.

Transform's organisational activities include:
 Carrying out research, policy analysis and policy development
 Challenging government to demonstrate rational, fact-based evidence to support its policies and expenditure
 Promoting alternative, evidence-based policies to parliamentarians, government and government agencies
 Advising non-governmental organisations whose work is affected by drugs in developing drug policies appropriate to their own mission and objectives
 Providing an informed and clear voice in the public and media debate on UK and international drug policy
The organisation is consulted regularly by its key audiences in policy making, the NGO sector and the media.

Public impact
Transform has been steadily gaining support from professionals and public figures whose fields include policy making, academia, business, church, judiciary, police, media, public health and medicine. Transform regularly appears in mainstream media debating, advising and responding to current issues within the drug policy field.

Other activities
Transform has a media blog which covers current drug policy issues, developments and news.

Transform has published the following books:
 How to regulate Stimulants: A practical guide (November 2020)
How to regulate Cannabis: A practical guide (November 2013)
 After the War on Drugs: Blueprint for Regulation (November 2009)
 After the War on Drugs: Tools for the Debate (October 2007)
 After the War on Drugs: Options for control (October 2004)
Transform has also published a series of reports and briefings on drug policy.

See also
 Advisory Council on the Misuse of Drugs
 Arguments for and against drug prohibition
 Drug liberalisation
 Drug policy reform
 Prohibition (drugs)
 Release (agency)

References

External links
 Official website

Health charities in the United Kingdom
Drug policy of the United Kingdom
Drug policy organizations
Drug policy reform
Organizations established in 1996
Public policy think tanks based in the United Kingdom
Cannabis law reform in the United Kingdom